The 2007 New Hampshire Wildcats football team represented the University of New Hampshire in the 2007 NCAA Division I FCS football season. The Wildcats were led by ninth-year head coach Sean McDonnell and played their home games at Cowell Stadium in Durham, New Hampshire. They were a member of the Colonial Athletic Association. They finished the season 7–5, 4–4 in CAA play. They received an at-large bid into the FCS playoffs, where they lost in the first round to Northern Iowa.

Schedule

References

New Hampshire
New Hampshire Wildcats football seasons
New Hampshire Wildcats football